Dulcie is a feminine given name which may refer to:

People
 Dulcie Cooper (1903–1981), Australian actress
 Dulcie Deamer (1890–1972), Australian novelist, poet, journalist and actor
 Dulcie Foo Fat (born 1946), British-born Canadian landscape painter
 Dulcie Gray (1915–2011), British actress
 Dulcie Hartwell (1915–2012), South Africa trade union leader
 Dulcie Holland (1913–2000), Australian composer and music educator
 Dulcie Howes (1908–1993), South African ballet dancer
 Dulcie Markham (1914–1976), Australian prostitute and associate of gangland figures
 Dulcie Ethel Adunola Oguntoye (1923–2018), English-born Nigerian jurist who was the country's second female judge
 Dulcie Mary Pillers (1891–1961), English medical illustrator
 Dulcie September (1935–1988), South African anti-apartheid political activist who was assassinated
 Dulcie Wood, former South Africa and Southern Transvaal Test cricketer

Fictional characters
 the title character of Defining Dulcie, a young adult novel by Paul Acampora
 the title character of Dulcie's Adventure, a 1916 American silent film
 a computer in Dulcie and Decorum, a science fiction short story by Damon Knight
 Dulcie Duveen, a character and the future Hastings' wife in The Murder on the Links detective novel by Dame Agatha Christie
 Dulcie Maes, a character in the film adaptation of the The Best Little Whorehouse in Texas musical

See also
Dulcie Ranges National Park, national park in the Northern Territory, Australia
Dulce (disambiguation)

English feminine given names